Thomas D'Alesandro Stadium,  known as Kiryat Haim Stadium, is a multi-purpose stadium in Kiryat Haim, Israel. It is used mostly for soccer matches and is the home stadium of Hapoel Haifa's youth teams. It used to be home to the first teams of Hapoel as well as Maccabi Haifa, but was replaced by Kiryat Eliezer Stadium in 1955.

The stadium was built with help from the Jewish community of Baltimore, Maryland and named for the mayor of Baltimore, Thomas D'Alesandro.

External links
Official website of Maccabi Haifa
Official website of Hapoel Haifa

Football venues in Israel
Multi-purpose stadiums in Israel
Hapoel Haifa F.C.
Jews and Judaism in Baltimore
Jews and Judaism in Haifa
Maccabi Haifa F.C.
Sports venues in Haifa
Kiryat Haim